Jordan participated in the 2010 Summer Youth Olympics in Singapore.

Medalists

Badminton

Boys

Gymnastics

Artistic Gymnastics

Boys

Swimming

Taekwondo

References

External links
Competitors List: Jordan

2010 in Jordanian sport
Nations at the 2010 Summer Youth Olympics
Jordan at the Youth Olympics